The home bias puzzle could refer to two distinct economic phenomena:

Equity home bias puzzle, the fact that individuals and institutions in most countries hold modest amounts of foreign equity despite the presence of large potential gains from diversification.
Home bias in trade puzzle, a widely discussed problem in macroeconomics and international finance related to over consumption of domestically produced goods relative to imports.